The World Para Athletics European Championships (European Para Athletics Championships), known prior to 2018 as the IPC Athletics European Championships is an event organized by World Para Athletics, the international athletics federation established under the International Paralympic Committee (IPC) in 2016. Athletes with a physical disability compete, and there is also a specific category for athletes with an intellectual disability. Organised biennially, the original Games ran from 2003 to 2005 as an Open Championship but the event was frozen in 2005, but returned in 2012 in Stadskanaal, Netherlands.

The first IPC Athletics European Championships was held in Assen, Netherlands in 2003 as an Open Championship.

Championships

Results 
 https://www.team-thomas.org/res03/resectotal.html - 2003 (:it:Campionati europei di atletica leggera paralimpica 2003)
 https://web.archive.org/web/20160329210227/www.fsrim.org.mk/images/stories/rezultati/2005/ipc_espoo%202005.pdf - 2005 (:it:Campionati europei di atletica leggera paralimpica 2005)
 https://www.paralympic.org/stadskanaal-2012 - 2012
 https://www.paralympic.org/swansea-2014 - 2014
 https://www.paralympic.org/grosseto-2016 - 2016
 https://www.paralympic.org/berlin-2018 - 2018
 https://www.paralympic.org/bydgoszcz-2021/results - 2021

Classification
F = field athletes.
T = track athletes.
P = pentathlon.
11-13 – visually impaired, 11 and 12 compete with a sighted guide.
20 – intellectual disability.
31-38 – cerebral palsy or other conditions that affect muscle co-ordination and control. Athletes in class 31-34 compete in a seated position; athletes in class 35-38 compete standing.
41-46 – amputation, les autres.
51-58 – wheelchair athletes.

Medal table
As of 2021.

* In the 2005 IPC Athletics European Championships, Australia, Brazil, Canada, China, Iran, Japan, Jordan, Saudi Arabia and United Arab Emirates were all guests in the championships and have won medals for their country respectively.

See also
World Para Athletics Championships
European Athletics Championships

References

 
European championships
European IPC
European
Parasports competitions
Recurring sporting events established in 2003
Biennial athletics competitions